The 1983 Purdue Boilermakers football team represented Purdue University during the 1983 NCAA Division I-A football season. Led by second-year head coach Leon Burtnett, the Boilermakers compiled an overall record of 3–7–1 with a mark of 3–5–1 in conference play, placing sixth in the Big Ten. Purdue played home games at Ross–Ade Stadium in West Lafayette, Indiana.

Schedule

Personnel

Game summariesf

Notre Dame

at Miami (FL)

at Minnesota

Michigan State
 Scott Campbell 30/50, 300 yards

at Ohio State

at Iowa

Illinois
 Scott Campbell 30/43, 388 yards

Northwestern

at Michigan

Wisconsin

at Indiana

References

Purdue
Purdue Boilermakers football seasons
Purdue Boilermakers football